Elrose is a town located just to the north of the Coteau Hills. It is south of Rosetown and north of Swift Current on Highway 4 and Highway 44. A community in the middle of an agricultural economy, Elrose has also become a local hub of activity in the oil industry. The town is surrounded by the Rural Municipality of Monet No. 257.

History 
Some homesteaders and other settlers were established in the area before the arrival of the railroads, being situated along the remains of the historic Swift Current-Battleford Trail, but the majority of newcomers arrived by rail later.  In 1909, the Rural Municipality Monet 257, Saskatchewan was organized. It was named after a local farmer, Fortunat Monet (pronounced Monette). The town of Elrose was originally called LaBerge after local landowner Albert LaBerge. After the railway arrived in 1913, the countryside quickly filled with people and a meeting was called to discuss a permanent name for the town. Elrose was chosen, although the origin of this name is unclear for certain.

Elrose incorporated as a village in 1914. Schools and grain elevators were built, the town grew as more people arrived, and prairie sod was turned under to sow crops. The newly tilled land was rich, agriculture was profitable, and communities thrived. In 1951 Elrose reached Town status. During the 60s and 70s smaller villages in the area (Hughton, Wartime, Forgan, Greenan) began to decline and their populations migrated to Elrose.

The Town of Elrose continues to move forward with the times and new prosperity appears as the local oilpatch is growing significantly. The agriculture industry is thriving as well, contributing to recent growth in the community.

Elrose is part of Treaty 6 territory.

Demographics 

Climate

Government
Elrose is part of the Cypress Hills—Grasslands Federal Riding with David Anderson as the federal Member of Parliament representing this town in Ottawa.    Elrose belongs to the provincial constituency Rosetown-Elrose, with the elected Member of the Legislative Assembly Jim Reiter who represents this town in Regina.   The town of Elrose has its affairs looked after by Elrose Town Council, currently headed by Mayor Dane MacDonald.

Education
Elrose Composite School provides both primary and secondary for Elrose and surrounding rural areas.  Elrose Composite School is part of the Sun West School Division which provides education to the west-central part of Saskatchewan, one of the largest school divisions in the area. Early childhood education is provided at the community owned daycare, the Elrose ABC Family Centre.

Recreation 
As with most rural Saskatchewan towns, Elrose offers a variety of opportunities for people to get out and enjoy themselves. There is the Elrose Memorial Hall, a 40' x 120' structure built in the 1950s and expanded in 2019, that serves as an excellent venue for a variety of events including dances, plays, weddings and auctions.

The Elrose-Monet Uniplex is a multi-use facility located at the southern end of Elrose's Main Street. This facility was constructed following the loss by fire of the original Elrose Arena. The Elrose-Monet Uniplex houses a skating rink, curling rink, and (a rarity for most small towns) an olympic sized indoor swimming pool. In 2021 a major project was completed; installing a concrete floor in the skating arena. The arena floor is now able to be used year round for a variety of activities and events.  The building serves as a base for the sports grounds behind it, which include baseball diamonds, a batting cage, and a number of full service campsites. The Uniplex continues to be an outstanding facility for the town and surrounding community.

Recreational parks
Elrose Regional Park

Library
Wheatland Regional Library

Media

Newspapers
Eston-Elrose Press Review

Transportation
Previous to the building of railroads, many travellers through the area followed the historic Swift Current-Battleford Trail. This winding cart trail connected Fort Battleford on the North Saskatchewan River with the Saskatchewan Landing, a natural crossing on the South Saskatchewan River. Both Highway 4 and Highway 44 serve vehicular traffic to and from Elrose.

See also
Sun West School Division
List of communities in Saskatchewan
List of rural municipalities in Saskatchewan

References

External links

Towns in Saskatchewan